Harold Eugene Martin (October 4, 1923 – July 4, 2007) was a Pulitzer Prize-winning newspaper editor and publisher who was also a director of the Billy Graham Evangelistic Association. During his career, Martin lived in the U.S. states of Alabama, New York, Missouri, Arkansas, Tennessee and Texas.

See also

References

"Newspaperman Harold Martin dies at 83", Hearst Newspapers, Laredo Morning Times, July 6, 2007
http://ssdi.rootsweb.com/cgi-bin/ssdi.cgi?lastname=Martin&firstname=Harold&start=781
http://www.topix.com/forum/city/bedford-tx/T62M3RJQRN0D54SVI
http://www.pulitzer.org/cgi-bin/year.pl?type=w&year=1970&FormsButton2=Retrieve

American newspaper publishers (people)
American newspaper editors
Pulitzer Prize for Investigative Reporting winners
1923 births
2007 deaths
American male journalists
Journalists from Texas
Baptists from Texas
United States Marines
United States Marine Corps personnel of World War II
People from Fort Worth, Texas
People from Beaumont, Texas
People from Tennessee
American ranchers
Writers from Montgomery, Alabama
Businesspeople from Birmingham, Alabama
People from Cullman, Alabama
Samford University alumni
Syracuse University alumni
Deaths from Alzheimer's disease
Deaths from cancer in Tennessee
Neurological disease deaths in Tennessee
St. Louis Globe-Democrat people
Journalists from Alabama
Baptists from Alabama
Baptists from New York (state)
20th-century American businesspeople
20th-century Baptists
20th-century American journalists